Galleh Zani (also Romanized as Galleh Zanī and Galleh Zenī; also known as Gelzanī) is a village in Abdan Rural District, in the Central District of Deyr County, Bushehr Province, Iran. At the 2006 census, its population was 24, in 5 families.

References 

Populated places in Deyr County